The following lists events that happened during 1903 in Australia.

Incumbents

Monarch – Edward VII
Governor General – John Hope, 7th Earl of Hopetoun (until 29 January), then Hallam Tennyson, 2nd Baron Tennyson
Prime Minister – Edmund Barton (until 24 September), then Alfred Deakin
Chief Justice – Samuel Griffith (from 5 October)

State premiers
Premier of New South Wales – John See
Premier of Queensland – Robert Philp (until 17 September), then Arthur Morgan
Premier of South Australia – John Jenkins
Premier of Tasmania – Elliott Lewis (until 9 April), then William Propsting
Premier of Western Australia – Walter James
Premier of Victoria – William Irvine

State governors
Governor of New South Wales – Admiral Sir Harry Rawson
Governor of Queensland – Major General Sir Herbert Chermside
Governor of South Australia – Hallam Tennyson, 2nd Baron Tennyson (until 17 July)
Governor of Tasmania – Captain Sir Arthur Havelock
Governor of Western Australia – Admiral Sir Frederick Bedford (from 24 March)
Governor of Victoria – Sir George Clarke (until 24 November)

Events
 20 February – The Flag of Australia, altered so that the stars of the Southern Cross (except the smallest one) have seven points each, is approved by Edward VII.
 6 October – The High Court of Australia convenes for the first time.
 24 November – Sir George Clarke retires as Governor of Victoria. Sir John Madden, the lieutenant governor, acts in his place until the appointment of a new governor.
 28 November – The oil tanker  strikes a reef at the entrance to Port Phillip Bay. Two days later, its cargo of 1,300 tonnes of crude oil is released, causing the first major oil spill in Australia.
 16 December – Australia's second federal election is held, the first in the world in which women were permitted to vote and stand for parliament. The incumbent Protectionist Party led by Alfred Deakin defeated the opposition Free Trade Party led by George Reid. Selina Anderson, Vida Goldstein, Nellie Martel, and Mary Moore-Bentley become the first women in the British Empire to stand for a national parliament; none are successful.
 18 December – The first train runs from Rockhampton to Brisbane.

Arts and literature

 Edward Officer wins the Wynne Prize with Glenora
 The Austral Society was founded due to the influence of The Toowoomba poet George Essex Evans

Sport
 Lord Cardigan wins the Melbourne Cup
 New South Wales wins the Sheffield Shield

Births
 10 January – Pud Thurlow, cricketer (d. 1975)
 21 January – Sir John Eccles, neurophysiologist and Nobel recipient (d. 1997)
 22 April – Daphne Akhurst, tennis player (d. 1933)
 22 June – Sir Garfield Barwick, 7th Chief Justice of Australia (d. 1997)

Deaths
 2 January – Sir Frederick Sargood, Victorian politician (born in the United Kingdom and died in New Zealand) (b. 1834)
 9 February – Sir Charles Gavan Duffy, 8th Premier of Victoria (born in the United Kingdom and died in France) (b. 1816)
 12 September – Duncan Gillies, 14th Premier of Victoria (born in the United Kingdom) (b. 1834)

See also
1903
1900–1909

References

 
Australia
Years of the 20th century in Australia